Tom Cat is an album by Lee Morgan recorded in 1964, though only issued in 1980. It was originally released as LT 1058. While lesser known in comparison to The Sidewinder and other albums, it features several of Morgan's contemporary Blue Note recording artists such as McCoy Tyner, Art Blakey, and Jackie McLean. After The Sidewinders huge commercial success, Tom Cat and Search for the New Land from earlier in 1964 were both shelved. Instead, Alfred Lion, Blue Note's producer, encouraged Morgan to record a new funky theme, (now dubbed, "the Sidewinder lineage") and brought him back in the studio to record The Rumproller. Search for the New Land was released in 1966, but Tom Cat remained unreleased until 1980.

Track listing
All compositions by Lee Morgan except where noted
"Tom Cat" – 9:50
"Exotique" – 9:34
"Twice Around" – 7:36
"Twilight Mist" (McCoy Tyner) – 6:57
"Riggarmortes" – 7:27

Personnel
Lee Morgan – trumpet
Curtis Fuller – trombone
Jackie McLean – alto saxophone
McCoy Tyner – piano
Bob Cranshaw – bass
Art Blakey – drums

References

1981 albums
Albums produced by Alfred Lion
Lee Morgan albums
Blue Note Records albums
Albums recorded at Van Gelder Studio